Madivaru Airport  is an airport on Madivaru, Lhaviyani Atoll, Maldives.

The island was previously used for military training. In May 2018 the government contracted Kuredu Holdings (the developer of Kuredu island) to develop an airport. The project required reclaiming three hectares of land.
The construction contractor was Beijing Urban Construction Group (BUCG).

It is operated by Island Aviation Services Limited (IASL).

See also
 List of airports in the Maldives

References

Airports in the Maldives
2022 establishments in the Maldives
Airports established in 2022